Code Blue – Emergency is a 1987 science fiction novel  by Northern Irish writer James White, part of his  Sector General series.

White said in an interview that originally he intended to end the series with Star Healer (1985), by which time the central characters had reached the top levels in their careers. However Ballantine Books persuaded him to continue, and he extended the stories' range by introducing new central characters beginning with Code Blue – Emergency.

Plot 
The protagonist of the story is Sommaradvan healer Cha Thrat. She bravely saved a human pilot who crashlanded on her planet, despite a complete lack of knowledge about his physiology. Contact with her species was established by the accident, so knowledge of their social customs is still virtually non-existent. However, she is invited to join the Sector General staff.

Cha Thrat innocently wreaks havoc by following her instincts and social customs. First she befriends a hypochondriac Chalder. Next, she is invited to assist at a therapeutic surgery operation to amputate the limb of a Hudlar, which will prolong its life (following events depicted in the previous novel in the series, Star Healer). When given the honour of cutting the limb, she obliges – and then deliberately cuts her own arm off as well, in accordance with the custom of her people. Next she saves the untouchable patient Khone (see Star Healer), and then finds a weird parasite species on a derelict spaceship. Due to the chaos she causes, every department in the hospital now refuses to allow her near their patients. O'Mara values her unusual approaches, and decides to add her to his staff.

References

1987 British novels
1987 science fiction novels
Novels by James White (author)
Sector General
Del Rey books
Books with cover art by David Burroughs Mattingly